The Hotel Whitcomb is a San Francisco hotel that was built from 1911 to 1912. Located at 1231 Market Street, the Whitcomb opened in 1912 as San Francisco's temporary city hall and then reopened in 1917 as a 400-room hotel.

Development and use as temporary city hall
Plans for the building began in 1910 with the hiring of architects Wright & Rushforth and an agreement to lease the building for three years to the City of San Francisco as a temporary city hall (the old San Francisco City Hall was destroyed by fire spawned by the 1906 San Francisco earthquake). From the outset, the intention was to convert the building into a hotel once the new, permanent city hall was completed. The staggered uses required the architects to prepare "two sets of drawings, one superimposing the plans for the municipal building upon the plans for the hotel."

The eight-story, steel-and-concrete building opened as the temporary city hall in March 1912. The basement of the building served as a city jail during this time.

Conversion to hotel use
With the completion of San Francisco City Hall in 1916, the building was converted into a 400-room hotel that opened in 1917.  The hotel was named for Adolphus Carter Whitcomb whose estate owned the property.

When it opened, the hotel was proclaimed "the last word in modern hoteldom" with "the most modern fireproof construction", Pavenazetta marble, and a palm-filled, glass-enclosed observation deck and sun parlor on the roof. The owners also imported 300,000 feet of Central American Jenezerro hardwood which was used to manufacture furniture, doors, and other interior work for the hotel. The total cost of the project was placed at more than $2.25 million, including $700,000 for original construction of the temporary city hall, $400,000 for structural changes to convert the building into a hotel, and $150,000 for furnishings.

In 1922, a new wing with an additional 102 guest rooms was added at a cost of $250,000 for the structure and another $100,000 for the furnishings and equipment. The Whitcomb included a large ballroom from which concerts were broadcast during the property's heyday.

Subsequent uses
During World War II, the Whitcomb provided office space for the Office for Emergency Management, the organization responsible for organizing and administering the internment of Japanese Americans.

In 1963, the hotel was converted into residential rentals, with no transient occupancy. During this period, the property was known simply as The Whitcomb. In subsequent years, the property became a hotel again and underwent multiple name changes, including "Biltmore Hotel", "San Franciscan Hotel", "Ramada Plaza", before the "Hotel Whitcomb" name was restored in 2007.

In 2020 the hotel became a shelter for homeless due to the pandemic.

Further reading
 "The New Hotel Whitcomb", by Edward F. O'Day, Architect and Engineer, pp. 51-56 (1917).

References

Hotels in San Francisco
City halls in California
Civic Center, San Francisco
Hotels established in 1912
Hotel buildings completed in 1912